Jeff Kashiwa (born 1963) is saxophonist with the jazz fusion band the Rippingtons and one of three with the Sax Pack, as well as having recorded several albums under his own name.

Life and career
Jeff Kashiwa was born in 1963 in Louisville, Kentucky but moved to Seattle, Washington as a young child. He credits the public school's music program for inspiring his interest in music, along with his father, who died in 1992, who was a fan of jazz music including Benny Goodman and Glenn Miller. While attending school, his father gave him an old silver clarinet but, when he later saw a row of saxophones at school, Kashiwa knew he had found the instrument for him.

As a local gig musician working small jobs, Kashiwa wanted a more permanent position in a band and, after searching for some time without success, he approached bassist Steve Bailey of the Rippingtons, of whom he was a fan, and hired Bailey to play along with him.  He eventually sought an audition for the Rippingtons, one of the genre's most successful bands, which led to him joining them following a festival concert and Brandon Fields' departure from the group. Prior to his audition, he prepared by learning every song in the group's library, making his eventual step into Field's large shoes seemingly effortless. Kashiwa recorded his first two solo albums, ("Remember Catalina" and "Walk A Mile"), during his tenure with the Rippingtons.

In 1999, though, he left the Rippingtons to concentrate on his own band, Coastal Access, which included Melvin Davis (Bass), Allen Hinds (Guitar), Dave Hooper (drums) and Dave Kochanski (Keyboards/Synths). Eric Marienthal and Paul Taylor both covered the sax player spot in the Rippingtons for a few years, but Kashiwa temporarily rejoined the band in 2007 for their 20th Anniversary Tour, and continues to record and perform with the group from time to time.

In 2004, Kashiwa got in touch with some of his saxophone peers to start a new group called the Sax Pack, led by three sax players, building on their collective musical passion for jazz, funk and R&B. "The Sax Pack" features Jeff Kashiwa, Steve Cole & Kim Waters. Along with being musically cohesive, the trio share a unique and comical camaraderie on stage. The Sax Pack released three CDs, "The Sax Pack" (2008), "The Pack is Back" (2009) and "Power of 3" (2015) on Shanachie Records.

Kashiwa not only plays soprano, alto and tenor saxophones, flute and the EWI (Electronic Wind Instrument) but also composes, produces and teaches.

He attended Berklee College of Music in 1981-83, where he developed an interest in straight-ahead jazz and, as a student, was picked as second alto chair by Disney's All American College Band.  He eventually became an instructor. Kashiwa later transferred to Cal State Long Beach and received his Bachelor's degree in Music in 1985. He currently teaches Music Technology at Shoreline College, as well as private courses for students of all ages. Kashiwa has a wife, Chaunte, and a daughter, Catalina.

Discography

As leader
 1995 Remember Catalina 
 1997 Walk a Mile 
 2000 Another Door Opens
 2002 Simple Truth 
 2004 Peace of Mind
 2007 Play
 2009 Back in the Day 
 2012 Let It Ride 
 2017 Fly Away
 2021 Sunrise

As a member of the Rippingtons
 1990 Welcome to the St. James' Club
 1991 Curves Ahead
 1992 Weekend in Monaco
 1994 Sahara
 1996 Brave New World
 1997 Black Diamond
 2011 Côte D'Azur

As a member of the Sax Pack
 2008 The Sax Pack - Steve Cole, Jeff Kashiwa, Kim Waters
 2009 The Pack Is Back - Steve Cole, Jeff Kashiwa, Kim Waters
 2015 Power of 3 - Steve Cole, Jeff Kashiwa, Kim Waters

References

External links
 
 The Sax Pack Official Site
 [ AllMusic.com profile]
 

1963 births
Musicians from Louisville, Kentucky
Smooth jazz saxophonists
Musicians from Seattle
Berklee College of Music alumni
American musicians of Japanese descent
Living people
The Rippingtons members
21st-century saxophonists
Native Language Music artists